

The Bleriot-SPAD S.36 was a French reconnaissance aircraft built in the early 1920s.

Design
The S.36 was a biplane with a monocoque fuselage of wood and canvas construction. Only one airframe was built, and flight tests ended due to the failure of the supercharger.

Specifications

See also

References

SPAD aircraft
Biplanes
Single-engined tractor aircraft
Aircraft first flown in 1923